The Shah Jahan Mosque, also known as the Jamia Masjid of Thatta, is a 17th-century building that serves as the central mosque for the city of Thatta, in the Pakistani province of Sindh. The mosque is considered to have the most elaborate display of tile work in South Asia, and is also notable for its geometric brick work - a decorative element that is unusual for Mughal-period mosques. It was built during the reign of Mughal emperor Shah Jahan, who bestowed it to the city as a token of gratitude, and is heavily influenced by Central Asian architecture - a reflection of Shah Jahan's campaigns near Samarkand shortly before the mosque was designed.

Location
The mosque is located in eastern Thatta - the capital of Sindh in the 16th and 17th centuries before Sindh's capital was shifted to nearby Hyderabad. It is located near the Makli Necropolis, a UNESCO World Heritage Site. The site is approximately 100 kilometres from Karachi.

Background

Shah Jahan sought refuge in Thatta from his father Emperor Jahangir, after he had rebelled against his father. Shah Jahan was impressed by the hospitality he received by the Sindhi people, and ordered construction of the mosque as a token of gratitude. Construction of the mosque may have also been partially motivated by a desire to help alleviate the effects of a devastating storm that impacted the region in 1637, and which had nearly destroyed Thatta.

Shah Jahan's campaigns in Central Asia during this era influenced the mosque's architectural style, as Timurid influences were introduced into the Mughal Empire as his armies pressed towards Samarkand, in modern-day Uzbekistan. Despite the fact that the Emperor was not in the region during its construction, and so was unlikely directly involved in its construction, its profuse tile-work and intricate brick work indicate that it was funded by the Mughal's imperial coffers.

History

Persian inscriptions at the mosque indicated that it was built between 1644 and 1647, during the reign of Mughal Emperor Shah Jahan. An eastern addition was completed in 1659, during the reign of Emperor Aurangzeb.

The mosque's mihrab had initially been incorrectly aligned with Mecca. The Sufi mystic, Makhdum Nooh, who is buried in the nearby city of Hala is said to have been approached by the mosque's planners in order to correct its alignment. Popular tradition maintains that Makhdum Nooh then corrected the error overnight by the power of his prayer, thereby ensuring his status as a saint. Historical records show that the mosque's mihrab had actually been rebuilt a century after the mosque's construction.

Architecture
The Shah Jahan Mosque's architectural style is overtly influenced by Turkic and Persian styles. The mosque is characterized by extensive brickwork and the use of blue tiles, both of which were directly influenced by Timurid architectural styles from Central Asia − from where the previous rulers of Sindh, the Tarkhans, had hailed before the region was annexed by the Mughals in 1592.

Decorative elements

Tile work

The profuse use of tiles is considered to be the most elaborate display of tile work in the Indian Subcontinent. Unlike the Wazir Khan Mosque in Lahore, another Shah Jahan era mosque, the mosque in Thatta does not employ the use of fresco.

The mosque's tiles represent a direct influence of the Timurid style. The mosque employs cobalt blue, turquoise, manganese violet, and white tiles.

The mosque's dome is embellished with exquisite blue and white tile-work arranged in stellated patterns to represent the heavens. Its walls feature calligraphic tile work, signed by Abdul Ghafur and Abdul Sheikh.

The tiles' location and arrangement displays Persian Safavid influence, and features several colours on a single tile, unlike tile work at Lahore which featured a single colour on each tile. The use of multicolour tiles and floral patterns reflects Persian Kashani influences.

Brick work

The mosque features extensive brickwork laid in geometric patterns, which is a decorative element unusual for Mughal era mosques, and is an element of Timurid architecture adopted for use in the mosque. The mosque's brickwork was also influenced by Sindhi vernacular styles, which in turn was influenced by Persian architecture. Brick work is most notable in the arcades surrounding the central courtyard, while concentric rings of brick are used to embellish the underside of peripheral domes.

Layout

The layout of the mosque may have been influenced by the conservative Timurid-style Humayun Mosque in Kachhpura, near the city of Agra, in modern-day India. The main entryway into the mosque complex is through a Persian-style charbagh, or quadrangle garden.

It has a four-iwan layout. The main prayer hall is set to the west of its central courtyard, which features iwans, or portals, in each of its four cardinal directions. The courtyard is rectangular in shape, and measures 169 feet by 97 feet. It is surrounded by aisled galleries, which are lined with 33 arches.

The mosque's mihrab features pierced screens - an element that is commonly employed on Mughal funerary monuments, but unusual in Mughal mosques. The mosque features excellent acoustics; a person speaking on one end of the dome can be heard from the other end when the speech exceeds 100 decibels. Prayers in the main prayer hall can be heard throughout the entire building.

The mosque is unusual for its lack of minarets. It has a total of 93 domes, the most of any structure in Pakistan.

Conservation
Restoration works were carried out by Emperor Aurangzeb in 1692, as well as by Murad Ali Khan Talpur in 1812. The mosque was inscribed on the tentative UNESCO World Heritage list in 1993, but has not been conserved to the same high standards as the Wazir Khan Mosque or Badshahi Mosque in northern Pakistan.

Gallery

Further reading
Khan, Ahmed Nabi and Robert Wheeler. Islamic Architecture in South Asia, Oxford: Oxford University Press, 2003.
Lari, Yasmeen. Traditional Architecture of Thatta, Karachi: Heritage Foundation, 1989.
Mumtaz, Kamil Khan. Architecture in Pakistan, Singapore: Concept Media Pte Ltd, 1985.
Nadiem, Ihsan H. Historic Mosques of Lahore, Lahore: Sang-e-Meel Publications, 1998.
Nadiem, Ihsan H. Makli : The Necropolis at Thatta, Lahore: Sang-e-Meel Publications, 2000.

See also
 Wazir Khan Mosque - another Shah Jahan period mosque. Located in Lahore, the mosque is considered to be the most elaborately decorated Mughal mosque.
 List of mosques in Pakistan

References

External links

 Video of the Shah Jahan Mosque, Thatta
 Oriental Architecture - Shah Jahan Mosque

Thatta District
Mughal mosques
Mosques in Sindh
1647 establishments in Asia
Religious buildings and structures completed in 1659
Mosque buildings with domes
Tourist attractions in Thatta
Grand mosques